Charles Walter Clark (1885–1972) was an architect who worked for the Metropolitan Railway from 1911 to 1933 and was responsible for designing 25 stations, five of which are listed buildings today.

Career
Born in 1885, he was educated at Emanuel School then worked for a year for the London, Brighton and South Coast Railway before moving to the Met as assistant architect in 1910. After serving in the Royal Naval Volunteer Reserve during World War I, his was appointed Architect by the Metropolitan Railway in 1921. Elected Fellow of the Royal Institute of British Architects in 1930, he did not join the London Passenger Transport Board in 1933 when the Met was absorbed with the other London underground railways. He died in 1972.

Buildings
Between 1911 and 1933 he designed 25 Metropolitan Railway stations, as well as designing houses in Metro-land and Chiltern Court, the large, luxurious block of apartments over Baker Street station, that opened in 1929. Central London stations were built in a Neoclassical style. These included Farringdon, Aldgate, Edgware Road and Paddington (all still extant today) together with Euston Square and Notting Hill Gate (both demolished). Rural stations, such as those at Watford, Croxley, Northwood Hills and Kingsbury were designed to set the tone for the local development. , six of these stations are listed buildings, including Baker Street station, which was re-modelled in 1911–13 and is listed Grade II*. One station is listed by the local authority as being of local importance.

List of listed buildings

References

External links
 London Transport Museum Photographic Archive (search results for 'Charles W Clark')

Metropolitan Railway
Fellows of the Royal Institute of British Architects
1885 births
1972 deaths
History of the London Underground
People associated with transport in London
British railway architects